Steinbeck may refer to several people, mostly related to John Steinbeck, the American writer, including:
Thomas Steinbeck, John Steinbeck's eldest son and author/screenwriter
John Steinbeck IV, John Steinbeck's second son and journalist
Christoph Steinbeck, European researcher

German-language surnames